This is a list of communities in New Brunswick, a province in Canada. For the purposes of this list, a community is defined as either an incorporated municipality, an Indian reserve, or an unincorporated community inside or outside a municipality.

Cities 

New Brunswick has eight cities.

Indian reserves

First Nations

Parishes 

New Brunswick has 152 parishes, of which 150 are recognized as census subdivisions by Statistics Canada.

Local service districts

Rural communities 

New Brunswick has seven rural communities.

Towns and villages 

New Brunswick has 27 towns and 66 villages.

Neighbourhoods

Local service districts

Other communities and settlements 
This is a list of communities and settlements in New Brunswick.

A–B 
 A

 Aboujagne
 Acadie  
 Acadie Siding
 Acadieville
 Adams Gulch
 Adamsville  
 Albert Mines
 Albrights Corner
 Alderwood 
 Aldouane    
 Allainville   
 Allardville
 Allison
 Ammon
 Anagance
 Anderson Road
 Anderson Settlement
 Andersonville
 Anfield
 Anse-Bleue
 Apohaqui
 Arbeau Settlement
 Armond
 Arthurette    
 Ashland
 Astle
 Aulac
 Avondale

 B

 Back Bay
 Bagdad
 Baie-Sainte-Anne 
 Baie Verte
 Bailey   
 Balla Philip
 Barnaby 
 Barnesville      
 Barryville
 Bass River
 Bates Settlement
 Bay du Vin
 Bayside
 Beaverbrook
 Beaver Dam
 Bellefleur
 Belledune
 Benjamin River
 Berwick
 Bettsburg
 Big Hole
 Big River
 Blackland (Restigouche)
 Black Point
 Black River
 Black River-Hardwicke
 Black River Bridge
 Bloomfield
 Bloomfield  
 Bloomfield Ridge
 Boiestown
 Bocabec
 Boundary Creek
 Brantville
 Brockway
 Browns Flat
 Bull Lake
 Burnsville
 Burton
 Burtts Corner

Top of page

C–G 
 C

 Cains River
 Caithness
 Camp Harmony
 Campbell Settlement     
 Canton-des-Basque
 Cantor
 Caribou Depot 
 Caron Brook   
 Carrolls Crossing
 Casillis   
 Caverhill
 Chamcook
 Chapel Grove
 Chatham Head
 Chelmsford
 Clarkville
 Cloverdale
 Cocagne
 Colebrooke Settlement
 Coles Island
 Collette
 Connors
 Cornhill 
 Coteau Road

 D

 Dalhousie Junction
 Damascus
 Daulnay
 Dawsonville
 Debec         
 Derby
 Devereaux
 Digdeguash
 Douglas  
 Dubé Settlement 
 Duffys Corner
 Dugas 
 Duguayville      
 Dumfries
 Dundee 
 Dunlop
 Durham Bridge

 E

 Eel Ground     
 Eel River Cove 
 Elgin  
 Elm Hill  
 Escuminac
 Esgenoôpetitj
 Evandale  
 Évangéline

 F

 Fairisle   
 Five Fingers
 Flatlands
 Fords Mills   
 Four Falls

 G

 Gauvreau    
 Geary
 Glassville
 Glencoe
 Glen Levit
 Glenwood, Northumberland County
 Glenwood, Restigouche County
 Gondola Point
 Gordonsville
 Grafton
 Grand Falls Portage
 Grande-Digue   
 Gravel Hill  
 Gray Rapids  

Top of page

H–L 
 H

 Hainesville
 Hampstead
 Hanwell
 Harcourt
 Hardwood Ridge
 Hatfield Point 
 Hardwicke    
 Hartfield
 Harvey 
Haute-Aboujagane 
 Haut-Lamèque   
 Haut-Sheila    
 Havelock
 Hawkshaw
 Hazeldean
 Head of Millstream
 Hebron   
 Holtville
 Honeydale
 Howard
 Hoyt
 Humphrey Corner      

 I

 Indian Mountain
 Inkerman
 Irishtown

 J

 Janeville
 Jemseg
 Johnsville
 Juniper   

 K

 Kedgwick River 
 Keswick Ridge   
 Kingsclear   
 Kingston 
 Kouchibouguac

 L

 L'Etang
 Lac-des-Lys
 Lac Unique
 Lagacéville
 Lake George
 Lakeville    
 Lakeville
 LaPlante 
 Lavillette
 Lawrence Station 
 Limestone, Carleton County
 Limestone, Victoria County
 Lincoln
 Little Shemogue
 Lockstead 
 Lorne      
 Losier Settlement 
 Lower Coverdale 
 Lower Newcastle
 Ludlow
 Lutes Mountain

Top of page

M–P 
 M

 Mactaquac
 Madran
 Magaguadavic Settlement  
 Magundy     
 Malauze
 Maltais
 Maltampec
 Mann Mountain Settlement     
 Maple Green
 Maple Ridge
 Maugerville
 McGivney
 McGraw Brook
 McKendrick
 McKenzie Corner
 McLeods  
 McNamee
 McNeish
 Menneval
 Midland
 Midland
 Millerton
 Miramichi Bay
 Moulin-Morneault
 Mount Hebron
 Mount Middleton
 Mountain Brook

 N

 Napadogan
 Napan
 Nash Creek
 Nashwaak Bridge
 Nashwaak Village
 Nasonworth        
 Nauwigewauk
 Nelson Hollow
 New Avon   
 New Denmark
 New England Settlement
 New Jersey
 New Mills
 New Zion
 Nicholas-Denys
 Noonan     
 Nordin
 North Forks
 North Head 
 North Tetagouche  
 Northampton     
 Notre-Dame 
 Notre-Dame-de-Lourdes
 Notre-Dame-des-Érables   

 O

 Oak Bay   
 Odell   
 Ortonville
 Oxbow

 P

 Pabineau Falls
 Parker Ridge
 Pembroke     
 Penniac
 Penobsquis
 Petit-Ouest 
 Petite-Lamèque
 Petite-Réserve
 Petite-Rivière-de-l'Ile 
 Pigeon Hill        
 Pinder   
 Pocologan
 Point La Nim
 Pointe-à-Bouleau
 Pointe-Alexandre
 Pointe-Canot
 Pointe-du-Chene
 Pointe-Sapin
 Pokemouche 
 Pokeshaw
 Pokesudie
 Pokiok
 Pont-Lafrance
 Pont-Landry
 Popelogan Depot
 Porten
 Priceville
 Prince William

Top of page

Q–S 
 Q

 Quatre-Milles
 Quispamsis    

 R

 Ramsay Sheds
 Rang-Double-Nord
 Rang-Double-Sud
 Rang-Sept
 Red Bank
 Richibouctou-Village
 Riley Brook        
 Ripples  
 Rivière-du-Portage       
 Rivière-Verte     
 Robertville        
 Robinsonville  
 Rosaireville
 Rossville 
 Rothesay   

 S      

 Saint-Arthur
 Saint-Charles
 Saint-Ignace
 Saint-Irenée
 Saint-Jean-Baptiste-de-Restigouche        
 Saint-Joseph-de-Madawaska 
 Saint-Laurent
 Saint-Martin-de-Restigouche
 Saint-Maure
 Saint-Norbert
 Saint-Sauveur
 Saint-Simon
 Sainte-Anne-de-Kent
 Sainte-Louise
 Sainte-Marie-de-Kent 
 Sainte-Rose
 Salmon Beach
 Saumarez
 Scotch Lake
 Scoudouc    
 Seal Cove
 Sea Side
 Sevogle
 Shannonvale  
 Sheffield
 Shemogue     
 Siegas
 Sillikers
 Simpsons Field
 Sisson Ridge
 Six-Milles
 Skiff Lake
 Slope Road
 Southampton  
 South Tetagouche 
Speerville
 Springfield
 Squaw Cap
 St. Margarets               
 Stickney  
 Strathadam
 Stonehaven
 Sunny Corner
 Sussex          

Top of page

T–Z 
 T

 Tabusintac    
 Targettville  
 Taxis River
 Taymouth        
 Temperance Vale
 Tetagouche Falls  
 Thibault  
 Tilley 
 Tinker
 Titusville     
 Tracadie Beach
 Tracadie–Sheila
 Tracy Depot
 Tremblay

 U

 Upper Blackville  
 Upper Charlo  
 Upper Crossing  
 Upper Kent     
 Upper Queensbury
 Upsalquitch

 V

 Val-Comeau
 Val-d'Amour
 Val-Doucet
 Val-Melanson
 Victoria Corner
 Village-Blanchard
 Village-Saint-Laurent

 W

 Waterville
 Waterville
 Wayerton   
 Weaver Siding
 Welsford
 White Rapids
 Whites Brook
 Whites Cove
 Wicklow
 Williamstown
 Willow Grove
 Wilsons Beach
 Wirral
 Wyers Brook

 Z

 Zealand

Top of page

See also 

 Demographics of New Brunswick
 Geography of New Brunswick
 List of cities in New Brunswick
 List of neighbourhoods in New Brunswick
 List of municipalities in New Brunswick 
 List of parishes in New Brunswick
 List of towns in New Brunswick
 List of villages in New Brunswick

Notes 
Cities

Parishes

References 

communities
New Brunswick
Communities in New Brunswick by county